The 2014 Open GDF Suez was a women's professional tennis tournament played on indoor hardcourts. It was the 22nd edition of the Open GDF Suez (formerly known as the Open Gaz de France) and a Premier tournament on the 2014 WTA Tour. It took place at Stade Pierre de Coubertin in Paris, France from January 25 through February 2, 2014.

Points and prize money

Point distribution

Prize money

1 Qualifiers prize money is also the Round of 32 prize money
* per team

Singles main-draw entrants

Seeds

 1 Rankings as of January 13, 2014

Other entrants
The following players received wildcards into the main draw:
  Caroline Garcia
  Petra Kvitová
  Kristina Mladenovic

The following players received entry from the qualifying draw:
  Lara Arruabarrena 
  Anna-Lena Friedsam
  Johanna Larsson
  Galina Voskoboeva

The following players received entry as lucky loser:
  Barbora Záhlavová-Strýcová

Withdrawals
Before the tournament
  Dominika Cibulková (fatigue) → replaced by  Stefanie Vögele
  Ana Ivanovic (left hip injury) → replaced by  Andrea Petkovic
  Kaia Kanepi (low back injury) → replaced by  Marina Erakovic
  Petra Kvitová (respiratory illness) → replaced by  Barbora Záhlavová-Strýcová
  Lucie Šafářová (right shoulder injury) → replaced by  Elina Svitolina

Retirements
  Marina Erakovic (back injury)

Doubles main-draw entrants

Seeds

 1 Rankings are as of January 13, 2014

Other entrants
The following pairs received wildcards into the doubles main draw:
  Alizé Cornet /  Caroline Garcia
  Daniela Hantuchová /  Petra Kvitová

Withdrawals
During the tournament
  Sara Errani (cramping)

Champions

Singles

  Anastasia Pavlyuchenkova def.  Sara Errani, 3–6, 6–2, 6–3

Doubles

  Anna-Lena Grönefeld /  Květa Peschke def.  Tímea Babos /  Kristina Mladenovic, 6–7(7–9), 6–4, [10–5]

References

External links
 

Open GDF Suez
Open GDF Suez
Open GDF Suez
2014 in Paris
2014 in French tennis